Indoor hockey at the Asian Indoor and Martial Arts Games was first introduced at the 2007 Asian Indoor Games in Macau.

The first edition was won by Iran, since then the sport did not appear on the program. The sport was reintroduced at the 2021 Asian Indoor and Martial Arts Games.

Men's tournament

Results

Summary

Team appearances

Women's tournament

Results

See also
Field hockey at the Asian Games
Men's Indoor Hockey Asia Cup
Women's Indoor Hockey Asia Cup

References

External links
Asian Hockey Federation

 
Sports at the Asian Indoor and Martial Arts Games
Asian Indoor and Martial Arts Games
Asian Indoor and Martial Arts Games